Berry Creek (formerly, Berry Valley) is a census-designated place about  northeast of Oroville, California in hilly terrain at  above mean sea level. The community is located along the Oroville-Quincy Highway on the shore of Madrone Lake. The community is home to Berry Creek Elementary School (K-8), 2 small mountain churches, 1 mini mart w/ gas, 1 small community park. Berry Creek is home to the annual Berry Festival which is held during August.

Berry Creek is inside Area code 530 and wired phone numbers follow the format (530) 589-xxxx. The population was 525 in 2012.

There is a California Department of Forestry and Fire Protection fire station at an area called Harts Mill just south of the community. Harts Mill was probably a mining community named for a stamp mill. The USGS lists a variant name of Virginia Mill for the area. The CDF Fire Dept is located in Berry Creek approximately  past the U.S. Post Office on Hwy 162 (Nearest cross street: Berry Creek Rd/Bloomer Hill Rd). There are two main mountains in Berry Creek to distinguish areas. Bloomer Hill (mountain nearest the Post Office) and Bald Rock mountain (mini mart and community park). The Berry Festival is always held on Bald Rock mountain.

Berry Creek was mostly destroyed by the Bear Fire on September 9, 2020.

History
Berry Creek's first post office was established in 1875 being transferred from Oak Arbor; it changed locations several times before being closed in 1912. It was re-established in 1913, closed again in 1926, and re-opened in 1927.

In November 2018, the Camp Fire, a major wildfire that destroyed Paradise and Concow, threatened all of Berry Creek. Wooded areas of Berry Creek were burnt and some structures were destroyed. Most of Berry Creek was evacuated for two weeks from November 10–24.

On the evening of September 9, 2020, the Bear Fire reached the edge of town at 10 PM PDT and burned nearly all the structures in Berry Creek to the ground, destroying Berry Creek. 14 people were killed in the town.

Demographics

The 2010 United States Census reported that Berry Creek had a population of 525 in 2012. The population density was 11 people per square mile. The racial makeup of Berry Creek was 520 White, 1 African American, 4 Native American, 0 Asian, 0 Pacific Islander, 0 other races, 0 from two or more races, and 0 Hispanic or Latino.

525 people (100% of the population) lived in households, 0 (0%) lived in non-institutionalized group quarters, and 0 (0%) were institutionalized.

There were 490 households, out of which 199 had children under the age of 18 living in them, 313 were opposite-sex married couples living together, 60% had a female householder with no husband present, 40% had a male householder with no wife present. There were 43% unmarried opposite-sex partnerships, and 7 (1.0%) same-sex married couples or partnerships. 207 households (31.7%) were made up of individuals, and 81 (12.4%) had someone living alone who was 65 years of age or older. The average household size was 3.1 There were 399 families (61.2% of all households); the average family size was 4.25.

The population was spread out, with 183 people (12.9%) under the age of 18, 92 people (6.5%) aged 18 to 24, 203 people (14.3%) aged 25 to 44, 601 people (42.2%) aged 45 to 64, and 345 people (24.2%) who were 65 years of age or older. The median age was 54.3 years. For every 100 females, there were 111.6 males. For every 100 females aged 18 and over, there were 110.0 males.

 Total population including Berry Creek, Brush Creek and Madrone Lake communities.

There were 515 housing units at an average density of 11.2 per square mile (6.6/km), of which 490 were occupied, of which 525 (80.5%) were owner-occupied, and 127 (19.5%) were occupied by renters. The homeowner vacancy rate was 4.5%; the rental vacancy rate was 7.1%. 494 people (81.2% of the population) lived in owner-occupied housing units and 31 people about (18%) lived in rental housing units.

References

Sources
 US Department of Education, National Center for Educational Statistics.
 US Geological Survey, National Geographic Names Database.
 US Department of Commerce, miscellaneous records derived from public data sets used to determine geographic attributes like area code and ZIP code.
 Map: Berry Creek, California, 7.5 minute quadrangle, 1994, US Geological Survey.
 US Census Bureau, 2000 census statistical area records, (mostly used for data matching against other sources).
 web site of US Senator Barbara Boxer

Census-designated places in Butte County, California
Census-designated places in California